Gushnaspdād, known in Byzantine sources as Gousanastadēs, was a Sasanian nobleman, who was kanarang during the reign of Balash (r. 484–488), and Kavad I (r. 488–531).

Biography
Gushnaspdad first appears in 496, as one of the supporters of Jamasp. After Balash's accession, Gushnaspdad urged the Sasanian noblemen to execute Kavad I, the brother of Jamasp. He is reportedly said to have told the Sasanian noblemen while holding a knife: "You see this knife, how extremely small it is; nevertheless it is able at present time to accomplish a deed which, be assured, my dear Persians, a little later two myriads of mail clad men could not bring to pass."

However, the Sasanian nobles declined the decision, and instead had Kavad imprisoned; however, he later managed to escape and took refugee in Central Asia. In 498/9, Kavad returned to Iran with the aid of the Hephthalites. Kavad then captured Ctesiphon, restored his rule, and had Gushnaspdad executed. Gushnaspdad was replaced by Adergoudounbades as kanarang.

References

Sources
 
 

5th-century births
490s deaths
5th-century Iranian people
Sasanian generals
Executed military personnel
Kanarang
People executed by the Sasanian Empire
Generals of Balash